The 2003 Vuelta a Burgos was the 25th edition of the Vuelta a Burgos road cycling stage race, which was held from 11 August to 15 August 2003. The race started and finished in Burgos. The race was won by Pablo Lastras of the  team.

General classification

References

Vuelta a Burgos
Vuelta a Burgos